Fearless is four-issue limited series is written by Mark Sable and David Roth, with art by PJ Holden, and is published by Image Comics.

The series is the story of Adam Rygert, a superhero who must depend on an anti-fear drug to keep his crippling anxiety at bay.

References

External links
Comics Radar 029 - Fearless Interview, Comics Radar, September 23, 2007

2007 comics debuts